Barricade is a 2007 horror–splatter feature film directed by Timo Rose, written by Timo Rose and Ted Geoghegan, and starring American actors Raine Brown and Joe Zaso and Germany's André Reissig, Thomas Kercmar, Manoush, and Andreas Pape.

Plot 
The film follows three friends, Nina (Brown), Michael (Zaso) and David (Reissig), as they travel to the Black Forest of Germany. While there, the trio are attacked by a family of deformed mountain people who murder and cannibalize anyone who ventures into their secluded territory.

Cast

Production 
Barricade was shot in Germany in 2006.

Reception 
Andrew Rose of HorrorSociety wrote that the story has been done many times before but never as violently, which makes it preferable to The Hills Have Eyes and Wrong Turn.

References

External links
 
 

2007 direct-to-video films
Camcorder films
2007 horror films
English-language German films
German horror films
German splatter films
Films about cannibalism
2007 films
German slasher films
2000s German films
Films set in the Black Forest